Samir de los Caños is a municipality in the province of Zamora, Castile and León, Spain. According to the 2004 census (INE), the municipality has a population of 227 inhabitants. As of 2022, Samir de los Caños had 163 inhabitants.

History 

With the creation—in 1833—of the current provinces, Samir de los Caños was attached to the Zamora’s, within the Region of León, which, like all Spanish regions of the time, lacked administrative powers. After the 1978 constitution, Samir became part of the autonomous community of Castilla y León in 1983, as a municipality integrated into the province of Zamora.

References 

Municipalities of the Province of Zamora